Christian Peter Dyvig (born 11 October 1964) is a Danish lawyer,  businessman and investor. He is the CEO and founder of C. P. Dyvig & Co. in Copenhagen.

Career
Dyvig obtained a LL:M: degree from  University of Copenhagen in 1987. He then practiced as a lawyer at Reumert & Partnere and served as  an external lecturer in Human Rights at University of Copenhagen until 1992 when he went to Switzerland where he obtained an MBA with honours from  the International Institute for Management Development in 1993. From October 1993 he worked for Morgan Stanley in London and later Frankfurt where he served as a Managing Director in the Mergers and Acquisitions Department where he headed up the Nordic and the German activity. . He was a partner in Nordic Capital from 2009 until 2009 when he became CTO of Lundbeckfonden and established his own firm  In 2009, C. P. Dyrvig & Co..

Private life
Christian Dyvig is the son of Peter Dyvig, a former Danish ambassador to  London, Washington and Paris. He is married to lawyer Mia F. Stefansen and lives in Hellerup. His interests include ballet and he is a board member of the Royal Danish Ballet's Foundation.

Further reading
  Lunde, Niels: 100 topledere; guide til dansk erhvervsliv. Akademisk Forlag. 2011.

References

1964 births
Living people
20th-century Danish businesspeople
21st-century Danish businesspeople
20th-century Danish lawyers
21st-century Danish lawyers
Danish company founders
Businesspeople from Copenhagen
University of Copenhagen alumni